Tomás António Gonzaga (11 August 1744c. 1810) was a Portuguese-born Brazilian poet. He wrote under the pen name Dirceu.

He is patron of the 37th chair of the Brazilian Academy of Letters.

Biography
Gonzaga was born in the freguesia (or parish) of Miragaia, in Porto, to João Bernardo Gonzaga and Tomásia Isabel Clark, who was of British descent. Gonzaga was sent back to Portugal as a teenager, to the University of Coimbra, to finish his studies and, at 24 years old, he finished his Law course. He presented himself as a candidate for a chair at the University, with the thesis Tratado de Direito Natural, heavily influenced by Enlightenment ideals.

He held this post until 1789, when he was accused of being involved with the Minas Conspiracy. Arrested, he was sent to a prison in Ilha das Cobras, Rio de Janeiro. He spent three years in prison, and although he asserted his innocence, the authorities were influenced by his friendship with the conspirators. In 1792 he was sentenced to perpetual exile in Angola, later commuted to a ten-year exile on the Island of Mozambique. By that time, he was engaged to a woman named Maria Doroteia Joaquina de Seixas Brandão, possibly the "Marília" of his verses. His hope of being freed from his prison in order to see his beloved again is a prominent theme of the second part of his poetry book Marília de Dirceu.

Arriving at Mozambique, he fell ill and was charitably received by a wealthy Portuguese gentleman. He then married his daughter, Juliana de Sousa Mascarenhas, having with her two children: Ana and Alexandre.

Gonzaga lived the rest of his life in exile, having a wealthy and happy life and becoming a lawyer. He would die of a tropical disease he contracted; his date of death is unknown, although it is commonly accepted to be in 1810. His remains are currently interred at the Museu da Inconfidência in Ouro Preto.

Works
 Marília de Dirceu, poetry book (1792)
 Cartas Chilenas, discontinued series of satirical poems (1863)
His reputation rests on Marília, which contains all his published verses and is organized into two parts, corresponding with the stages of his life, the second having been written in prison.

Representations in popular culture
 Gonzaga was portrayed in many Brazilian telenovels and films. He was portrayed by Gianfrancesco Guarnieri in the telenovel Dez Vidas (1969); by Luiz Linhares in the film Os Inconfidentes (1972) and by Eduardo Galvão in the film Tiradentes (1999).
 In the 1984 children's book A Ladeira da Saudade, by Brazilian author Ganymédes José, Gonzaga's unrequited love by Maria Doroteia is explored on a more modern context.

References

External links

  
 
 Gonzaga's biography at the official site of the Brazilian Academy of Letters 

1744 births
1810s deaths
Colonial Brazil
Poets
Brazilian male poets
Portuguese male writers
18th-century Brazilian poets
People from Minas Gerais
Brazilian people of Portuguese descent
Portuguese prisoners and detainees
18th-century Brazilian people
19th-century Brazilian people
Portuguese exiles
Patrons of the Brazilian Academy of Letters
People from Porto
University of Coimbra alumni
18th-century Portuguese people
19th-century Portuguese writers
19th-century male writers
18th-century male writers